Chitrasen Sahu (born 12 October 1992), also known as "Half Human Robo," is an Indian mountaineer and inclusion and disability rights activist. He is the first double amputee from India to scale Mount Elbrus, Mount Kilimanjaro (Tanzania) and Mount Kosciuszko (Australia). He is also a national wheelchair basketball player.

On 4 June 2014, while attempting to board a train, his hands slipped, he fell between the train and the platform and both of his legs were badly damaged. With help from RPF personnel he was admitted to a hospital in Raipur and in the space of 24 days both his legs were amputated.

Early life and career 
Sahu was born and brought up in Beloudi, Balod District, Chhattisgarh. He studied in a government school in his village and earned a bachelor's degree in civil engineering from Government Engineering College, Bilaspur. He was accepted into the Air Force and had begun preparing for competitive exams when the accident happened in which he lost both his legs.

Train accident 
Sahu boarded the Amarkantak Express, which runs from Raipur to Bilaspur, on 4 June 2014. At Bhatapatra station he left the train to buy some water. By the time he returned, the train had slowly started moving. He ran for a short distance and tried to board the moving train, but the door handle was greasy and he slipped, lost his balance and fell.

Initially, police suspected that he was either attempting suicide or had met with an accident while crossing the railway tracks, but the flagman of the train came forward and was able to explain the incident in detail. Sahu was taken to a hospital where one leg was amputated immediately; twenty-four days later, his second leg was also amputated due to medical negligence.

Mountaineering 
After his accident, Sahu decided to attempt the Seven Summits, aided by experienced mountaineer Rahul Gupta from Chhattisgarh. He started with Mount Kilimanjaro, reaching the summit on 23 September 2019 after six days in temperatures of -10 to -15 degrees C. He went on to scale Mount Kosciuszko, the highest peak in Australia, on 2 March 2020.

Activism 
With both legs amputated, Sahu found it difficult to get a motor vehicle licence, despite having purchased and specially modified a car for his needs. He was eventually awarded a judgement in his favour by the high court of Bilaspur, which opened the door for many other people with disabilities to obtain a license.

He established "Mission Inclusion," which provides assistance to people with disabilities through counseling and the donation of artificial limbs. He said in one interview, "All our focus is on making everyone understand that it is not sympathy which is needed, but rather heartfelt empathy to understand and create an accessible and inclusive environment."

References

External links 
 
 TEDx Talk by Chitrasen Sahu
 Chitrasen Sahu of Raipur
 Website of Community Platform by Alphapreneur
 Passion Talks by Romil barthwal
 र्चित्रसेन साहू ने सोमवार को प्रोस्थेटिक लेग और बुलंद हौसलों के साथ माउण्ट कोजिअस्को की चढ़ाई की है
 कोजीअस्को पर तिरंगा फहराने वाले चित्रसेन साहू को अमित जोगी ने दी बधाई
 खेल मंत्री पटेल ने पर्वतारोही चित्रसेन साहू को दी बधाई

Indian people with disabilities
Indian amputees
Chhattisgarh-related lists
Indian mountain climbers
People from Chhattisgarh
1992 births
Living people